Tim Uppal b. 1974 first elected in 2008 as Conservative member for Edmonton—Sherwood Park, Alberta.
 Rose-Marie Ur b. 1946   first elected in 1993 as Liberal member for Lambton—Middlesex, Ontario.
 Martin Luther Urquhart b. 1883   first elected in 1930 as Liberal member for Colchester, Nova Scotia.

U